"Spirit of the Boogie" is a funk/soul song recorded by Kool & the Gang as the title track for their 1975 album.

Critical reception
Daryl Easlea of the BBC said the song "showcases Claydes Smith’s tight, crunchy guitar grit and occasional member Donald Boyce’s "Boogie Man" vocals, as well as the Gang’s trademark group chants. Ronald Bell’s wayward synth gives it the requisite in-era cosmic edge." Amy Hanson of Allmusic proclaimed Spirit of the Boogie "is quintessential Kool & the Gang -- fiery funk which is kept in check by rhythm and chant." Record World said that the band's "jazz/rock expertise produces their mightiest outing since 'Hollywood Swingin'.'"

Personnel
 Robert Kool Bell – vocals, bass
 Ronald Bell – piano, tenor saxophone
Donald Boyce - Lead vocals
 George Brown – drums, vocals
 Robert Spike Mickens – trumpet, vocals
 Otha Nash – trombone, vocals
 Claydes Smith – guitar
 Dennis Thomas – alto saxophone, vocals
 Rick West – vocals

Track listing
De-Lite Records – DE-1567:

Chart history
"Spirit of the Boogie" was the group's third single to top the soul singles chart in the U.S., and was their fourth Top 40 hit, peaking at number thirty-five on the Billboard Hot 100.

Samples
"Spirit of the Boogie" has been sampled by Doug E. Fresh and The Notorious B.I.G.
It was interpolated in The Killers' 2017 song "The Man".
Part of the song's melody was sampled in The Afros' song titled "Feel It", the full song was sampled in "On The Black Line" by Michelle D'Clora.

References

1975 singles
Kool & the Gang songs
1975 songs